Tazehabad-e Karsavan (also Romanized as Tāzehābād-e Karsavān; also known as Tāzehābād) is a village in Bavaleh Rural District, in the Central District of Sonqor County, Kermanshah Province, Iran. At the 2006 census, its population was 268, in 59 families.

References 

Populated places in Sonqor County